Johnville F.C. was an Irish association football club based in Dublin and active during the 1940s, 1950s and 1960s. The club had a tradition of being a nursery club for both Shamrock Rovers and Shelbourne.

Jem Kennedy, the namesake of the SFAI Kennedy Cup, was devoted to Johnville FC, he trained and scouted many notable players.

Notable former players

Republic of Ireland internationals
  Tommy Dunne 
  Arthur Fitzsimons
  Dessie Glynn 
  Tommy Hamilton 
  Gerry Mackey 
  Ronnie Nolan

Republic of Ireland B internationals
  Eamonn Darcy

League of Ireland XI representatives
  Mickey Burke 
  Eamonn Darcy

Manchester United players
  Paddy Kennedy

Honours
FAI Youth Cup
Winners: 1945–46, 1952–53: 2
Runners Up: 1949–50, 1957–58, 1968–69: 3

References

Association football clubs in Dublin (city)
Defunct association football clubs in the Republic of Ireland
Association football academies in the Republic of Ireland
Association football clubs established in the 1940s
Association football clubs disestablished in the 1960s
1940s establishments in Ireland
1960s disestablishments in Ireland